The short beard codling (Laemonema barbatulum) is a species of marine bony fish in the family Moridae.

Description
The snout is fairly blunt and the upper jaw is slightly longer than the lower jaw. There is a short barbel on the chin and a flattened spine on the operculum. There are two dorsal fins with no spines and a total of from 69 to 76 soft rays. The first dorsal fin has 6 rays, the second of which is the longest, and the second dorsal fin originates immediately behind the first fin. Each pectoral fin has 17 to 23 soft rays. The pelvic fins are widely separated and each has two elongated soft rays; these fins originate to the front of the pectoral fins. The anal fin has no spines and has 57 to 63 soft rays. The caudal fin is small and rounded. The general colour of this fish is tan, the dorsal and anal fins having dark edges.

Distribution and habitat

Ecology
L. barbatulum is one of the dominant fishes in the more open areas of the continental slope, away from deepwater coral reefs. Other fish found in these locations include the underworld windowskate (Fenestraja plutonia), the Atlantic hagfish Myxine glutinosa, and the shortnose greeneye Chlorophthalmus agassizi. It is a demersal predator, feeding on such invertebrates as bivalves, gastropod molluscs, polychaete worms and tanaids, crushing its prey with its beak-like jaws.

References

External links 

shortbeard codling
Fish of the Western Atlantic
Fish described in 1883
Taxa named by George Brown Goode
Taxa named by Tarleton Hoffman Bean